Charonias is a Neotropical genus of butterflies in the family Pieridae.

Species
Charonias eurytele (Hewitson, 1853)
Charonias theano (Boisduval, 1836)

References

Pierini
Pieridae of South America
Pieridae genera
Taxa named by Julius Röber